Nelson Kuhn (born July 7, 1937) is a Canadian rower who competed in the 1960 Summer Olympics.

He was born in Whitemouth.

In 1960 he was a crew member of the Canadian boat which won the silver medal in the eights event.

External links
 profile

1937 births
Living people
Canadian male rowers
Olympic rowers of Canada
Rowers at the 1960 Summer Olympics
Olympic silver medalists for Canada
Olympic medalists in rowing
Medalists at the 1960 Summer Olympics
20th-century Canadian people